Enceliopsis is a small genus of flowering plants in the family Asteraceae. They are sometimes called sunrays. They are similar to the daisylike plants in the related genus Encelia. These three shrubs are native to the western United States and Canada.

 Species
 Enceliopsis argophylla - silverleaf sunray - Arizona (Mohave Co), Nevada (Clark Co), Utah (Washington Co)
 Enceliopsis covillei - Panamint daisy - Inyo County in California
 Enceliopsis nudicaulis - nakedstem sunray - California, Arizona, Nevada, Utah, Colorado, Idaho

References

External links
 
 USDA Plants Profile for Enceliopsis
  CalFlora Database: Enceliopsis species in California
 Jepson Manual Treatment of Enceliopsis

 
Asteraceae genera
Flora of the Western United States
Taxa named by Asa Gray
Taxa named by Aven Nelson